The Blue Grass League was a minor league baseball circuit at the Class D level that existed in the early 1900s. There were two incarnations of the league, one that ran from 1908 to 1912 and one that existed from 1922 to 1924. It consisted entirely of teams based in Kentucky.

1908–1912
Six teams played in the league's inaugural season: the Frankfort Statesmen, Lexington Colts, Richmond Pioneers, Shelbyville Grays, Winchester Hustlers and Lawrenceburg Distillers. The Statesmen finished in first place.

In 1909, the Hustlers, Pioneers, Statesmen and Colts returned to the league, while Shelbyville dropped its nickname and the Lawrenceburg team departed. In its stead were the Paris Bourbonites. The Hustlers finished in first place.

All teams from 1909 returned for 1910, though partway through the year the Shelbyville squad moved to Maysville to become the Maysville Rivermen. The Bourbonites finished first in the league. Baseball Hall of Fame member Casey Stengel played for Shelbyville/Maysville in 1910.

All teams from 1910 returned for 1911, with the Bourbonites finishing in first place again. There was also a playoff held that season, with the Bourbonites winning the series. 

In 1912, the Statesmen became the Frankfort Lawmakers. Winchester moved to Nicholas and then Mt. Sterling to finish the season as the Mt. Sterling Orphans. Outside of those changes, the league remained the same. Frankfort finished in first place.

1922–1924 
The inaugural season of the second incarnation of the league featured the Paris Mammoths, Maysville Cardinals, Cynthiana Merchants, Mt. Sterling Essex, Winchester Dodgers and Lexington Reos. The Mammoths finished in first, though the league playoff pitted Maysville against Cynthiana, with the former winning the series.

1923 saw multiple teams change names. The Merchants became the Cynthiana Cobblers and the Mammoths became the Paris Bourbons. The other teams remained the same. Cynthiana finished in first place.

The league consisted of only four teams in 1924 — Paris, Cynthiana, Lexington (now called the Lexington Studebakers) and Winchester. The Bourbons finished in first place.

Cities represented 
Cynthiana, KY: Cynthiana Merchants 1922; Cynthiana Cobblers 1923—1924
Frankfort, KY: Frankfort Lawmakers 1908—1912 
Lawrenceburg, KY: Lawrenceburg Distillers 1908 
Lexington, KY: Lexington Thoroughbreds 1908; Lexington Colts 1909—1912; Lexington Reds 1922—1923; Lexington Studebakers 1924
Maysville, KY: Maysville Rivermen 1910—1912; Maysville Cardinals 1922—1923
Mount Sterling, KY: Mount Sterling Orphans 1912; Mount Sterling Essex 1922—1923
Nicholasville, KY: Nicholasville 1912 
Paris, KY: Paris Bourbonites 1909—1912; Paris Bourbons 1922—1924 
Richmond, KY: Richmond Pioneers 1908—1912 
Shelbyville, KY: Shelbyville Millers 1908—1910 
Versailles, KY: Versailles Aristocrats 1908 
Winchester, KY: Winchester Reds 1908; Winchester Hustlers 1909—1912; Winchester Dodgers 1922—1924

Yearly standings

1908 to 1912
1908 Blue Grass League
 No Playoffs scheduled.
1909 Blue Grass League
  No Playoffs scheduled.
1910 Blue Grass League
schedule
 No Playoffs scheduled.
1911 Blue Grass League
schedule
Playoff: Paris 4 games, Winchester 0.
1912 Blue Grass League
 No Playoffs scheduled.

1922 to 1924
1922 Blue Grass League
schedule
Playoff: Maysville 3 games, Cynthiana 1. 
1923 Blue Grass League
No Playoffs were held.
1924 Blue Grass League
schedule
No Playoffs were scheduled.

References
 Johnson, Lloyd, and Wolff, Miles, eds., The Minor League Encyclopedia, 3rd edition. Durham, North Carolina: Baseball America, 2007.

Defunct minor baseball leagues in the United States
Baseball leagues in Kentucky
Sports leagues established in 1908
Sports leagues disestablished in 1924
1908 establishments in Kentucky
1924 disestablishments in Kentucky
Sports leagues disestablished in 1912
Sports leagues established in 1922